Vyacheslav Nikolayevich Voronin (born 5 April 1974 in Vladikavkaz) is a Russian track and field athlete who specialised in the high jump.

Voronin was a World Champion (1999) and European Indoor Champion (2000). His personal best is 2.40 metres, set in London in August 2000. He competed in Athens 2004 and Helsinki 2005, but did not win medals in either.

International competitions

References

 

1974 births
Living people
Sportspeople from Vladikavkaz
Russian male high jumpers
Olympic male high jumpers
Olympic athletes of Russia
Athletes (track and field) at the 2000 Summer Olympics
Athletes (track and field) at the 2004 Summer Olympics
Athletes (track and field) at the 2008 Summer Olympics
Goodwill Games medalists in athletics
Competitors at the 2001 Goodwill Games
World Athletics Championships athletes for Russia
World Athletics Championships medalists
World Athletics Championships winners
European Athletics Championships winners
European Athletics Indoor Championships winners
Russian Athletics Championships winners